Sixin Boulevard Station, is a station of Line 3 of the Wuhan Metro system. Located in Caidian District, it entered service on December 28, 2015.

Station layout

References

Wuhan Metro stations
Line 3, Wuhan Metro
Railway stations in China opened in 2015